Smilčić  is a village in Croatia. It is connected by the D502 highway.

References

Benkovac
Populated places in Zadar County
Serb communities in Croatia